Phlomis italica, the Balearic Island sage, is a species of flowering plant in the mint and sage family Lamiaceae, native to the Balearic Islands of Spain, and cultivated as a temperate ornamental plant. It is an evergreen shrub with large, oval, woolly grey-green leaves. In summer, circles of pale pink flowers appear at intervals along the erect stems. Though hardy, it prefers a sheltered position in full sun.

References

Flora of Spain
italica